Matthew Taylor Williams is a former Major League Baseball pitcher.

A native of Virginia Beach, Virginia, Williams attended Floyd E. Kellam High School and Virginia Commonwealth University. In 1991, he played collegiate summer baseball with the Chatham A's of the Cape Cod Baseball League.

Williams was originally drafted in the 4th round of the 1992 Major League Baseball Draft by the Cleveland Indians. He was chosen in the  Rule 5 draft by the Brewers, and the next April he made his major league debut. After a month and an ERA of 7.00, however, the Brewers returned him to the Yankees, and he never played in the majors again.

References

Sources

Major League Baseball pitchers
Milwaukee Brewers players
Watertown Indians players
Kinston Indians players
High Desert Mavericks players
Canton-Akron Indians players
Kissimmee Cobras players
Bakersfield Blaze players
Lynchburg Hillcats players
St. Petersburg Devil Rays players
Norwich Navigators players
Columbus Clippers players
Indianapolis Indians players
Norfolk Tides players
Chatham Anglers players
Baseball players from Virginia
1971 births
Living people
Sportspeople from Virginia Beach, Virginia